Gelvard-e Bozorg (also Romanized as Gelvard-e Bozorg; also known as Gīlavard Bozorg, and Gīlavard-e Bozorg) is a village in Peyrajeh Rural District, in the Central District of Neka County, Mazandaran Province, Iran. At the 2006 census, its population was 120, in 34 families.

References 

Populated places in Neka County